Charles Frederick Ernest Bartling (3 June 1912 – 30 January 1998) was an Australian rules footballer who played with North Melbourne and Fitzroy in the Victorian Football League (VFL).

He later served in the Australian Army in World War II, spending a year in New Guinea before fracturing his wrist and being declared unfit for rifle duty. He was discharged in November 1945.

Notes

External links 

1912 births
1998 deaths
Australian rules footballers from Melbourne
North Melbourne Football Club players
Fitzroy Football Club players
People from Northcote, Victoria
Military personnel from Melbourne